Mark Robert Filip (born June 1, 1966) is an American lawyer specializing in class action and white collar criminal and regulatory defense. Formerly a partner at Skadden, Arps, he currently practices in the Washington, D.C. office of Kirkland and Ellis. From 2004 until 2008, Filip served as a United States district judge of the United States District Court for the Northern District of Illinois. As the George W. Bush administration ended, Filip served as Deputy Attorney General of the United States, and as the Barack Obama administration began he briefly served as acting attorney general (from January 20, 2009, to February 3, 2009).

Early life and education 
Born in Chicago, Filip attended Maine South High School in Park Ridge, Illinois, the same high school attended by Hillary Clinton. He graduated from the University of Illinois at Urbana-Champaign in 1988 with Bachelor of Arts degrees in economics and history, where he was a member of Phi Kappa Psi fraternity. After college, he attended Christ Church at Oxford University in England on a Marshall Scholarship, and graduated in 1990 with a Bachelor of Arts in Law, First Class Honors. He then attended Harvard Law School, where he received his Juris Doctor magna cum laude in 1992 and was an editor of the Harvard Law Review.

After law school, Filip served as a law clerk to the Judge Stephen F. Williams of the United States Court of Appeals for the District of Columbia Circuit from 1992 until 1993 and then for Justice Antonin Scalia of the Supreme Court from 1993 until 1994.

Professional career 
Filip worked in private legal practice as an associate at Kirkland & Ellis from 1994 until 1995.  He then worked as an Assistant United States Attorney in Chicago from 1995 to 1999.  In that position he prosecuted cases in the trial and appellate courts involving a variety of offenses—including violent crimes, political, judicial, and police corruption, health care fraud, and international narcotics trafficking. While an AUSA, Filip received a Department of Justice Director's Award for Superior Performance as an Assistant U.S. Attorney.

Following his service at the U.S. Attorney's Office, Filip was a partner in the Chicago office of Skadden, Arps, Slate, Meagher & Flom from 1999 until 2004.  There, he practiced in a variety of areas of civil law and criminal law, and also had a number of pro bono cases, including several cases representing indigent defendants in connection with the Federal Defender's Office in Chicago.  Filip now is a partner in the Chicago office of Kirkland & Ellis.

Federal judicial service 
On April 28, 2003, Filip was nominated by President Bush to be a United States District Court judge for the Northern District of Illinois, to a seat vacated by Harry D. Leinenweber. After being confirmed 96–0 by the Senate on February 4, 2004, and receiving his commission on February 8, 2004, Filip was sworn into that office in March 2004. As a judge, he presided over numerous cases involving criminal, antitrust, securities fraud, immigration and other matters. Filip has taught for many years at the University of Chicago Law School, where he served from 2004 to March 2008 as the Bustin Lecturer and taught both advanced criminal law and first-year civil procedure. Filip officially resigned his judicial service on March 9, 2008.

Deputy attorney general and acting attorney general 
Filip was unanimously confirmed by the United States Senate on March 3, 2008, and he was sworn in as deputy attorney general on March 10, 2008. On August 28, 2008, Filip issued a memo regarding federal prosecution of business organizations, which reversed the Justice Department's aggressive policy of pursuing white collar crime. This came in the midst of a controversial case against KPMG, one of the Big Four accounting firms, for abetting AIG Financial Products in fraudulent transactions that would eventually contribute to the 2008 financial crisis. Filip was asked to assume the position of acting attorney general by then president-elect Obama. Filip led the department while President Obama's nominee, then attorney-general designate Eric Holder, awaited confirmation by the United States Senate. Holder was confirmed on February 2, 2009, and sworn in the next day thus ending Filip's tenure as the acting attorney general.

See also 
 List of law clerks of the Supreme Court of the United States (Seat 9)

References

External links

Kirkland biography
Presidential Nomination: Mark Robert Filip

|-

|-

1966 births
21st-century American judges
Alumni of Christ Church, Oxford
Assistant United States Attorneys
George W. Bush administration personnel
Harvard Law School alumni
Judges of the United States District Court for the Northern District of Illinois
People associated with Kirkland & Ellis
Law clerks of the Supreme Court of the United States
Living people
Marshall Scholars
Northwestern University faculty
Obama administration personnel
Skadden, Arps, Slate, Meagher & Flom people
United States Attorneys General
United States Deputy Attorneys General
United States district court judges appointed by George W. Bush
University of Chicago Law School faculty
University of Illinois Urbana-Champaign alumni